Rapperswil railway station is a railway station located next to the old town and harbour of Rapperswil in the Swiss canton of St. Gallen. It is the largest of four active railway stations in the municipality of Rapperswil-Jona (the other three being ,  and ). Rapperswil railway station is situated on the north shore of Lake Zürich at the northern end of the Seedamm, which separates the Obersee (upper Lake Zürich) from the main body of the lake.

Because the Seedamm carries both rail and road connections from the south shore of the lake, and because Rapperswil is the meeting point of three separate line from the northern side of the lake, the station is a major nodal point on the local rail network, notably of the ZVV. The first railway opened in 1859.

History 

In early 1859 the first steam train ran from Rapperswil – as a hub of railway lines from Rapperswil to Rüti and from Rapperswil to Schmerikon. Turntables and cranes were used to move cargo to/from the vessels at the harbour situated at nearby Fischmarktplatz.

In 1875, the Lake Zürich left bank line (Linksufige Zürichseebahn) from Zürich Hauptbahnhof to Ziegelbrücke opened along the south shore of the lake. In railway terms, this was linked to Rapperswil in 1878, when the Gotthardbahn established the line across the Seedamm. The Rapperswil shore of Lake Zürich had to wait until 1895 for the opening of the Lake Zürich right bank line (Rechtsufrige Zürichseebahn).

The famous Orient Express stopped in Rapperswil on its way from Varna to Zürich, Basel, Paris and Calais.

Since 1877 Rapperswil has been a major hub of what is now the Südostbahn (SOB), with a large depot. The current station building in Renaissance Revival architecture style was built in 1894/95, planned by architect Karl August Hiller, underlining the growing importance of tourism.

The railway station's infrastructure, including the bus terminal and the station building, were renewed in 2007/8, and the rail tracks and the infrastructure by June/July 2016.

Operation

Train 
Rapperswil railway station is an important junction station, where the Südostbahn's (SOB) Rapperswil–Pfäffikon railway line across the Seedamm meets with the Lake Zürich right bank line, the Wallisellen to Rapperswil via Uster line and the Rapperswil to Ziegelbrücke line.

Rapperswil is served by services of two S-Bahn-style networks, the Zürich S-Bahn and the St. Gallen S-Bahn. Services S5, S7, S15 and S40 of the Zürich S-Bahn call at this railway station. Connections to or from Zürich HB via either the right bank line (S7) or Uster line (S5/15) are very frequent, and the ride takes only about 36 minutes. The S40 provides a local link to Pfäffikon and Einsiedeln. Rapperswil is also the terminus of the hourly St. Gallen S-Bahn service S6 that operates south-east to Schwanden/Linthal via Ziegelbrücke. Rapperswil is also a calling point of the Voralpen Express, an InterRegio (IR) train operated by the SOB and providing an hourly direct link between St. Gallen and Lucerne. During weekends, there is also a nighttime S-Bahn service (SN5) offered by ZVV.

Summary of railway services:

  Voralpen-Express: hourly service to  via , and to  via .
 St. Gallen S-Bahn:
 Zürich S-Bahn:
 Nighttime S-Bahn (only during weekends):

Rapperswil is also an important depot for the rolling stock of the Zürich S-Bahn. Due to the station's hub status, one of the few SBB-CFF-FFS firefighting and rescue trains (LRZ) is based in Rapperswil.

Bus 
Buses provided by the Verkehrsbetriebe Zürichsee und Oberland (VZO) link the station to the upper northern shore of Lake Zürich and the Zürcher Oberland, and also operate the city's own Stadtbus Rapperswil-Jona. Two bus services provided by  link the railway station with Eschenbach and Wattwil and with Buech/St. Dyonis. Bus services depart from the forecourt of the railway station except line 991, which departs south of the railway station (Rapperswil Bahnhof Süd). The lines are as follows:

Boat 
Rapperswil harbour is adjacent to the railway station, and lake shipping services of the Zürichsee-Schifffahrtsgesellschaft (ZSG) connect with trains and buses, providing alternative, if rather slower, routes to Zürich and other lakeside towns on Lake Zürich. Most boats dock Ufenau island near Rapperswil harbour.

During summer, there is also a ferry across Obersee. The ferry connects a pier adjacent to the University of Applied Sciences Rapperswil (now part of OST), situated south of the railways station, with Lachen and Altendorf in the canton of Schwyz.

References

Further reading 
 Werner Stutz: Bahnhöfe der Schweiz von den Anfängen bis zum Ersten Weltkrieg. Orell Füssli, Zürich 1983. .

External links 
 
 

Railway stations in the canton of St. Gallen
Swiss Federal Railways stations
Buildings and structures in Rapperswil-Jona
1859 establishments in Europe
Railway stations in Switzerland opened in 1859